Owens Community College (OCC) is a public community college with campuses in Toledo and Findlay, Ohio.  Owens was founded in 1965 in Toledo and chartered in 1967.  The Findlay campus opened in 1983. Owens Community College is named after Michael J. Owens, the Toledo-based inventor of automated glass bottle-making technology.

Owens's service district includes Lucas, Wood, Hancock, and parts of Ottawa counties.

History
The Toledo campus was originally the Rossford Army Depot from 1941 to 1963.

Campuses

OCC also maintains a learning center in downtown Toledo. The new campus for Findlay was completed in fall of 2005.

OCC's Arrowhead Park campus, located in Maumee, closed in 2016.

In April 2007, Owens opened the new Center for Emergency Preparedness. This $20.5 million center serves as a state, regional and national education and resource center for public safety and emergency training. The  facility features full-size, state-of-the-art training props that were developed with emphasis on realism and safety, including a Boeing 727-100, burn simulators, dive and rescue pond and mock city. Training props are used to train students and area first responders on procedures for emergency situations and recovery maneuvers. The center a fiber-optic network for research and education. It will allow fire, police, emergency responders and other emergency personnel to conduct exercises via distance learning on a variety of simulated terror incidents, emergency hazards and natural disasters.

Academics
The college's community outreach includes recruiting employees from more than 500 business organizations to serve on advisory committees responsible for shaping and refining academic curricula.

In 2006, Owens Community College and Lourdes University formulated a partnership program called 60/60, which allows allied health students at Owens to also earn a baccalaureate degree at Lourdes.

The college continued to add off-campus educational sites for students. In December 2006, the college and Toledo Public Schools signed an agreement allowing the college to offer classes at the new Rogers High School. The college also partnered with the Putnam County Educational Service Center and began holding classes at its Skilled Learning Center.

The college has longstanding off-campus educational partnerships with Arcadia High School in Arcadia, Liberty-Benton High School near Findlay, Riverdale High School in Mt. Blanchard, Springfield High School in Holland and Swanton High School in Swanton.

Owens also offers Post Secondary Enrollment Options to area high school students. Qualified students have the opportunity to take classes at Owens that may count for both high school and college credit while they are still in high school. In many cases, the cost of tuition, books and other fees can be paid for by the state of Ohio.

Honor societies
 Alpha Mu Gamma (Nu Kappa Chapter)
 Chi Alpha Epsilon
 Chi Alpha Campus Ministries
 Epsilon Pi Tau
 Kappa Beta Delta (Pi Chapter)
 Phi Theta Kappa (Alpha Omega Pi Chapter) Toledo-Area Campus
 Phi Theta Kappa (Beta Xi Chi Chapter) Findlay-Area Campus
 Psi Beta - the national honor society in psychology for two year colleges
 Sigma Kappa Delta (Theta Alpha Chapter)
 Tau Alpha Pi

Athletics
The Owens Express compete in the Ohio Community College Athletic Conference. Men's sports include Basketball, Baseball. Women's sports include Basketball, Volleyball, and Softball.

Notable alumni
 Madison Hubbell - ice dancer
 Keiffer Hubbell - ice dancer
 James Kelly -  professional basketball player in the Israel Basketball Premier League
 Sean Bucknor - American-born Jamaican footballer
 Bill Laimbeer - NBA player

References

External links
 

Educational institutions established in 1965
Education in Toledo, Ohio
Education in Hancock County, Ohio
Buildings and structures in Hancock County, Ohio
Buildings and structures in Toledo, Ohio
Community colleges in Ohio
NJCAA athletics
1965 establishments in Ohio